The 1992 Canadian Grand Prix was a Formula One motor race held at Circuit Gilles Villeneuve on 14 June 1992. It was the seventh race of the 1992 Formula One World Championship.

The 69-lap race was won by Gerhard Berger, driving a McLaren-Honda, after he started from fourth position. Teammate Ayrton Senna took pole position and led until he suffered an electrical failure on lap 38, while Drivers' Championship leader Nigel Mansell spun off on lap 15 attempting to overtake Senna. Michael Schumacher finished second in a Benetton-Ford, with Jean Alesi third in a Ferrari.

Qualifying

Pre-qualifying report
In the Friday morning pre-qualifying session, the Footwork of Michele Alboreto was fastest for the third consecutive Grand Prix. He was less than three tenths of a second faster than Larrousse driver Bertrand Gachot, with Gachot's team-mate Ukyo Katayama nearly two seconds slower in third. The fourth and final pre-qualifier was Andrea Chiesa in the Fondmetal, nearly 4.5 seconds off Alboreto's pace.

The Andrea Moda team failed to capitalise on the improvement made at the last race in Monaco, as both cars failed to pre-qualify. Although the team and drivers had arrived at the circuit, their Judd engines had not, having been withheld by the freight forwarding agent for non-payment of debts. The team were able to borrow an engine from the Brabham team, which allowed Roberto Moreno to take part in the session, but he was nowhere near the required pace. There was no engine for Perry McCarthy's car, so he did not participate.

Pre-qualifying classification

Qualifying report
Qualifying produced a surprise as Ayrton Senna took pole position in his McLaren while championship leader Nigel Mansell could only manage third, behind Williams teammate Riccardo Patrese. This would turn out to be the only non-Williams pole of 1992, and one of only two not taken by Mansell that season.

Gerhard Berger took fourth in the other McLaren, followed by Michael Schumacher in the Benetton. Johnny Herbert impressed in the Lotus and took sixth, ahead of Martin Brundle in the second Benetton. The top ten was completed by the Ferraris of Jean Alesi and Ivan Capelli, and Mika Häkkinen in the second Lotus.

Qualifying classification

Race

Race report
Stefano Modena started from the back of the grid after his car failed to start.

At the start Senna took the lead from the two Williams-Renaults with Mansell getting ahead of Patrese then Berger, Schumacher, Herbert and Brundle. For the first 13 laps the top eight followed in close attention until next lap 14 Mansell tried to overtake Senna at the last chicane but the car ended off track and spun and came to a stop on the main straight. The Williams driver was out of the race and accusing Senna of pushing him off. As this was happening Berger had passed Patrese to make it a McLaren 1-2. On lap 18 Capelli crashed hard into the wall on the exit of turn four. Johnny Herbert retired on lap 34 with clutch problems and team-mate Mika Hakkinen retired one lap later when his gearbox failed meaning disaster for Lotus after both cars qualified in the top ten. On lap 37 Senna retired from the lead with electrical problems. Berger had by now pulled a couple of seconds lead on Patrese who was being chased by Brundle after the Englishman had taken advantage of Schumacher getting stuck behind Morbidelli's Minardi while lapping him. A few laps later Patrese was out as his gearbox failed making this the first double retirement for Williams. Brundle now chased after Berger and set fastest lap but then was also forced to retire with transmission problems with what was subsequently his fifth and final retirement of the season. Berger was in comfortable lead followed by Schumacher. Katayama was driving a good race but had to retire from fifth on lap 61 when his engine expired. Wendlinger finished fourth to score his first points in Formula one as well as the last points in Formula One for the March team. With sixth place for Érik Comas, Ligier scored their first points since the 1989 French Grand Prix almost three years prior.

Race classification

Championship standings after the race

Drivers' Championship standings

Constructors' Championship standings

References

Canadian Grand Prix
Canadian Grand Prix
Grand Prix
Grand Prix